The 2015 Eastern Washington Eagles football team represented Eastern Washington University in the 2015 NCAA Division I FCS football season. The team was coached by Beau Baldwin, who was in his eighth season with Eastern Washington. The Eagles played their home games at Roos Field in Cheney, Washington and were a member of the Big Sky Conference. They finished the season 6–5, 5–3 in Big Sky play to finish in a four way tie for fourth place. They failed to reach the FCS Playoffs for the first time since 2011.

Schedule

Source: Official Schedule

Despite also being a member of the Big Sky Conference, the game with Montana State on September 19 is considered a non conference game.

Game summaries

at #7 (FBS) Oregon

at Northern Iowa

Montana State

at Sacramento State

Cal Poly

at Idaho State

at Northern Colorado

Weber State

Northern Arizona

at Montana

Portland State

Ranking movements

References

Eastern Washington
Eastern Washington Eagles football seasons
Eastern Washington Eagles football